The 1993–94 BBL season was known as the Budweiser League for sponsorship reasons. The season featured a total of 13 teams, playing 36 games each.

The BBL secured a three year £1 million sponsorship deal with Budweiser and the divisions were re-organised once again. The Budweiser League would be tier one with the National League Division's below. The Budweiser League increased in number with the addition of the Division One champions Doncaster Panthers. The Cheshire Jets became the Chester Jets.

Thames Valley Tigers claimed the League Trophy and stormed to the regular season title, however the Bracknell-based side suffered a shock defeat to Derby Bucks and saw them eliminated in the Quarter-final of the Budweiser Championship Play-offs. Nevertheless, Tigers' Nigel Lloyd and Mick Bett were both awarded accolades as Most Valuable Player and Coach of the Year respectively. Worthing Bears also secured a double success by winning the play-offs and securing the National Cup.

Budweiser League Championship (Tier 1)

Final standings

The play-offs

Quarter-finals 
(1) Thames Valley Tigers vs. (8) Derby Bucks

(2) Worthing Bears vs. (7) Leicester City Riders

(3) Manchester Giants vs. (6) Birmingham Bullets

(4) Guildford Kings vs. (5) London Towers

Semi-finals

Final

National League Division 1 (Tier 2)

Final standings

National League Division 2 (Tier 3)

Final standings

National Cup

Third round

Quarter-finals

Semi-finals

Final

League Trophy

Group stage

Semi-finals 
Manchester Giants vs. Leicester City Riders

Thames Valley Tigers vs. Worthing Bears

Final

Budweiser All-Star Game

Seasonal awards 
 Most Valuable Player: Nigel Lloyd (Thames Valley Tigers)
 Coach of the Year: Mick Bett (Thames Valley Tigers)
 All-Star Team:
 Trevor Gordon (Manchester Giants)
 Herman Harried (Worthing Bears)
 Tony Holley (Thames Valley Tigers)
 Colin Irish (Worthing Bears)
 Nigel Lloyd (Thames Valley Tigers)
 Russ Saunders (Sunderland Scorpions)
 Peter Scantlebury (Thames Valley Tigers)
 Jason Siemon (Derby Bucks)
 Tyrone Thomas (Birmingham Bullets)
 Gene Waldron (Leicester City Riders)

References 

British Basketball League seasons
1
British